Jean-Jacques Honorat (born April 1, 1931) is a Haitian politician who served as prime minister of Haiti after the 1991 coup in Haiti from 1991 until 1992. He has also been a human rights activist and philantropist for over 60 years. He is also an author having published 16 books including a book titled Le Manifeste Du Dernière Monde in 1980.

Life 
Honorat was born on April 1, 1931, in Port-au-Prince. After completing his degrees in agronomy and law,, he became a human rights activist. He had been an activist for 40 years before becoming Prime Minister, while also working as a professor of law and human rights. The philanthropist and humanitarian was accused of having ties to François Duvalier. Honorat stated that their families were, indeed, close and in fact, there were family ties between them. However, in a December 1991 phone interview with correspondents from Washington D.C.'s EIR, he also stated that he quickly became an activist after Duvalier staged the 1961 coup, which was why he left his position as tourist director. The rift between families would lead to Honorat's eventual exile to New York after Francois' son, Jean-Claude Duvalier, unjustly expelled him from the country in 1980. Honorat became Prime Minister of Haiti on October 11, 1991. President Nérette and Honorat spoke out against the US-led embargoes, calling them genocides. Like many other prime ministers since 1988, Honorat's term would be short-lived and ended after interference by corrupt military officials. He spent eight months in office. He also served as Minister of Foreign Affairs and Worship from October to December 1991.

Jean-Jacques Honorat continues to be praised in the diplomatic scene. His degrees in agronomy and law, along with his fluency in French, Spanish, Creole, Mandarin, German, and English, served him well throughout his career. He is an author, publishing his first book Le Manifeste Du Dernière Monde in 1980.

References

1931 births
Living people
Prime Ministers of Haiti
Foreign Ministers of Haiti